Water Birds is a 1952 American short documentary film directed by Ben Sharpsteen. In 1953, it won an Oscar for Best Short Subject (Two-Reel) at the 25th Academy Awards. The film was produced by Walt Disney as part of the True-Life Adventures series of nature documentaries. It was shot in Technicolor by more than a dozen cameramen and was created in cooperation with the National Audubon Society and the Denver Museum of Natural History.

Plot
The film focuses on the different species of water birds and their habitats, showcasing the beauty and variety of these birds. Through its stunning cinematography and informative narrative, "Water Birds" educates and inspires audiences to appreciate the natural world and the creatures that inhabit it.

Cast
 Winston Hibler as Narrator

References

External links

1952 films
1952 documentary films
1952 short films
1950s short documentary films
American short documentary films
1950s English-language films
Disney documentary films
Disney short films
Documentary films about nature
Films directed by Ben Sharpsteen
Films produced by Walt Disney
Films scored by Joseph Dubin
Live Action Short Film Academy Award winners
RKO Pictures short films
Films with screenplays by Winston Hibler
1950s American films